Salt Creek Township, Ohio may refer to:

Salt Creek Township, Hocking County, Ohio
Salt Creek Township, Holmes County, Ohio
Salt Creek Township, Muskingum County, Ohio
Salt Creek Township, Pickaway County, Ohio
Salt Creek Township, Wayne County, Ohio

See also
Salt Creek Township (disambiguation)

Ohio township disambiguation pages